Anna Brechta Sapir Abulafia,  (born 8 May 1952) is a British academic who specialises in religious history. The main focus of her research is medieval Christian-Jewish relations within the broad context of twelfth and thirteenth-century theological and ecclesiastical developments. At the moment she is engaged in a project examining the place of Jews and Muslims in Gratian's Decretum and its glosses. Since 2015, she is the professor of the Study of the Abrahamic Religions in the Faculty of Theology and Religion at University of Oxford and a fellow of Lady Margaret Hall, Oxford.

Academic career
Anna Sapir Abulafia studied history at the University of Amsterdam (Candidaats Examen, 1974; Doctoraal Examen, 1978).  She gained her doctorate in theology (Church history) at the University of Amsterdam in 1984 and a higher doctorate, LittD, at Cambridge in 2014 (DLitt by incorporation in Oxford 2015).  In 1979 she was Wetenschappelijke Medewerker in medieval history at the University of Amsterdam.  After moving to the UK, she became a research fellow at Clare Hall, Cambridge, 1981–1986, and the Laura Ashley Research Fellow at Lucy Cavendish College 1987–90.  She was fellow, college lecturer and director of studies in history at Lucy Cavendish College Cambridge, 1990–2015, where she was graduate tutor (1992–1996), senior tutor (1996–2002) and vice-president (2002–2010). From 2013 to 2015 she was affiliated college lecturer and director of studies in history at Newnham College, Cambridge.  On 1 April 2015, she was appointed the professor of the Study of the Abrahamic Religions in the Faculty of Theology and Religion at University of Oxford and became a fellow of Lady Margaret Hall, Oxford.

In July 2020 she was elected a Fellow of the British Academy.

Personal life
Anna Sapir was born in New York in 1952.  She moved with her family to The Netherlands in 1967, where she completed her schooling and studied history at the University of Amsterdam.  In 1979, she moved to the UK and married the historian David Abulafia. They have two daughters.

Selected publications
Christians and Jews in the Twelfth-Century Renaissance, Routledge, 1995; paperback, 2014.
Christians and Jews in Dispute. Disputational Literature and the Rise of Anti-Judaism in the West (c. 1000–1150), 1998.
Religious Violence between Christians and Jews: Medieval Roots, Modern Perspectives, Palgrave MacMillan, 2002. (editor)
Christian-Jewish Relations, 1000–1300. Jews in the Service of Medieval Christendom, Routledge, 2011. (Medieval World Series)

References

1952 births
Living people
British historians of religion
Professors of the Study of the Abrahamic Religions
Fellows of Lady Margaret Hall, Oxford
Jewish historians
Fellows of the Royal Historical Society
Fellows of the British Academy
Jewish women writers
British women historians
20th-century American Jews
Historians of Jews and Judaism
Historians of Christianity
British medievalists
21st-century American Jews